Thomas Doane Chambers (born June 21, 1959) is an American former professional National Basketball Association (NBA) player. Chambers played basketball professionally from 1981 to 1997. Playing power forward in the NBA, Chambers was selected to four All-Star Games and he was also a two-time All-NBA Second Team member during his career. In December 2021, Chambers was nominated to the Naismith Memorial Basketball Hall of Fame but did not advance to the list of finalists.

High school
Chambers starred at Fairview High School in Boulder, Colorado. Hailing from an athletic family, Chambers was a promising 6-2 guard at the end of his sophomore year.  Suddenly, he grew six inches during the next six months.  As a junior, teammates marveled that he had not lost any coordination with that growth.  A broken wrist as a senior forced him to use his left hand more, improving his game.  An all-Colorado high school player, he was hotly recruited and enrolled at Utah.

College
At Utah, Chambers played center with star forward Danny Vranes. The two led successful teams in the Western Athletic Conference. He ran the floor well and had good shooting range. At the NBA level he would move to power forward. On Feb. 5, 2022, Chambers' jersey and number, 42, was retired during the Utes' game against Oregon.

Professional career

San Diego Clippers 
Chambers was drafted by the-then San Diego Clippers with the 8th pick in the 1981 NBA draft. After signing a $1.5 million four-year contract, he played at forward for the first time after being a center in college. On the injury-riddled young Clippers roster his rookie year, Chambers ended up the team's top scorer at 17.2 points per game, and he made 52.5% of his shots. On April 15, 1982, he set a then-career-high points total of 39 points in a 129–123 win against the Portland Trail Blazers.

The following season, on October 29, 1982, Chambers scored 29 points and grabbed 16 rebounds in San Diego’s home opener, a loss to the Phoenix Suns. The same season, the team had drafted power forward Terry Cummings, who went on to win Rookie of the Year, and the club felt it had to choose between the two young prospects, and they traded Chambers and Al Wood for James Donaldson, Greg Kelser, Mark Radford, a 1984 first round draft pick (Michael Cage was later selected) and a 1985 2nd round draft pick (Calvin Duncan was later selected).

Seattle SuperSonics 
Teaming with center Jack Sikma and guard Gus Williams, Chambers became a key piece to a winning team in his third NBA season. He played all 82 games and averaged 18.1 points per game.

The following year, though, Williams was traded, and the point guard who emerged was Gerald Henderson. After posting a team-high 21.5 points per game the season before, Chambers fell to third-most on the team in shot attempts, taking only 28 more shots more than Henderson that season. He still led the team at 18.5 points per game, but felt he was being passed around in the offense.

1986–87, however, was a big season for Chambers. Rookie Nate McMillan took over Henderson's spot and Chambers became one of three key scorers for the Sonics. He posted 23.3 points per game to reach All-Star status for the first time.  Chambers hit 85% of 630 free throw tries that season. He also again played all 82 games.

He was the star of the 1987 NBA All-Star Game, played in Seattle. He scored 34 points on 13 of 25 shooting and was named Game's Most Valuable Player. With the SuperSonics, he averaged 20.4 points, 6.6 rebounds, and 2.4 assists.

Phoenix Suns 
An avid hunter and horseback rider, Chambers had no interest in playing outside of his native West. He accepted a then-very pricey offer to join the Phoenix Suns in June 1988. Seattle declined to match the offer. His next three All-Star appearances would be as a Sun, the team he still works for today.

In Phoenix, coach Cotton Fitzsimmons expected Chambers to shoot the ball. In 1988–89 Chambers scored 25.7 points per game. In 1989–90 his total rose to 27.2 points per game. Just as his scoring hit new highs his team also improved. Point guard Kevin Johnson was the passer Chambers had long-awaited, and the duo became an outstanding NBA tandem.

Former Seattle teammate, Xavier McDaniel, joined the team in 1990–91, and the now 31-year-old Chambers again accepted a more team-oriented role for the Suns. His scoring, and the team's success, declined. He had been twice named All-NBA Second Team, but now just tried to fit in.

In 1992–93, the fifth and final season in Phoenix, Charles Barkley arrived to give the team the rebounder the team had long needed to truly contend. The now 33-year-old Chambers accepted a role as sixth man, while Barkley and Dan Majerle were the team's key scorers.

That team made it to the 1993 NBA Finals, where they lost 4 games to 2 to Michael Jordan's Chicago Bulls.

Utah Jazz 
Chambers still felt he had more to contribute, and accepted an offer to join the Utah Jazz in August 1993. He would back up star Karl Malone, and re-team with Jeff Hornacek from the Suns. The Jazz improved immediately and made it to the 1994 Western Conference Finals. Now age 35, Chambers had one more year to give before ending his first stint in the NBA as a 20,024 point NBA scorer.

Israel 
Chambers joined Maccabi Tel Aviv in Israel, for a season of play in the Israeli Super League and the FIBA EuroLeague, during the 1995–96 season. In the Israeli Super League, Chambers averaged 17.7 points, 6.3 rebounds, and 2.3 assists per game. He also won the Israeli League championship that season with Maccabi. In the FIBA EuroLeague's 1995–96 season, Chambers averaged 15.1 points, 6.8 rebounds, 1.5 assists, and 0.7 steals per game, in 32.8 minutes per game.

End of playing career 
After his stint in Israel, Chambers decided to reunite with the Phoenix Suns. However, before playing a single game of a second run there, he was traded to the Charlotte Hornets. He played twelve games with the Hornets but was then waived. Chambers would play in one more NBA game, with the Philadelphia 76ers, during the 1997–98 regular season, before retiring. In the last game of his career, played on November 26, 1997, he had six points, two rebounds, and two steals for the 76ers, against the Cleveland Cavaliers, in his only appearance with the team.

Player profile 
Chambers appeared in 16 NBA seasons as a member of the San Diego Clippers, Seattle SuperSonics, Phoenix Suns, Utah Jazz, Charlotte Hornets, and Philadelphia 76ers. Chambers scored 20,049 total points in the NBA for a career average of 18.1 points per game. His career high was a 60-point performance with the Suns against the Sonics on March 24, 1990. He appeared in four NBA All-Star Games during his career (1987, 1989, 1990, and 1991), earning game MVP honors in 1987 after scoring 34 points. He also played in the 1993 NBA Finals as a member of the Suns, but his team lost to the Chicago Bulls. He is one of just two players (alongside Antawn Jamison) currently eligible for induction into the Basketball Hall of Fame who have scored 20,000 points who have not been inducted.

Legacy 
Chambers was inducted into the Phoenix Suns Ring of Honor in April 1999 and became the first inductee since the Ring of Honor was installed at the then-America West Arena (now Footprint Center). As part of the induction ceremony, he received a bronze statue by artist Sam Wickey recreating his 1989 dunk over the New York Knicks guard Mark Jackson. Chambers was also honored with being inducted into the Utah Sports Hall of Fame in 2010, and the Arizona Sports Hall of Fame in 2019.

NBA career statistics

Regular season 

|-
| style="text-align:left;"|
| style="text-align:left;"|San Diego
| 81 || 58 || 33.1 || .525 || .000 || .620 || 6.9 || 1.8 || 0.7 || 0.6 || 17.2
|-
| style="text-align:left;"|
| style="text-align:left;"|San Diego
| 79 || 79 || 33.7 || .472 || .000 || .723 || 6.6 || 2.4 || 1.0 || 0.7 || 17.6
|-
| 
| style="text-align:left;"|Seattle
| 82 || 44 || 31.3 || .499 || .000 || .800 || 6.5 || 1.6 || 0.6 || 0.6 || 18.1
|-
| style="text-align:left;"|
| style="text-align:left;"|Seattle
| 81 || 60 || 36.1 || .483 || .273 || .832 || 7.1 || 2.6 || 0.9 || 0.7 || 21.5
|-
| style="text-align:left;"|
| style="text-align:left;"|Seattle
| 66 || 26 || 30.6 || .466 || .271 || .836 || 6.5 || 2.0 || 0.8 || 0.6 || 18.5
|-
| style="text-align:left;"|
| style="text-align:left;"|Seattle
| 82 || 82 || 36.8 || .456 || .372 || .849 || 6.6 || 3.0 || 1.0 || 0.6 || 23.3
|-
| style="text-align:left;"|
| style="text-align:left;"|Seattle
| 82 || 82 || 32.7 || .448 || .303 || .807 || 6.0 || 2.6 || 1.1 || 0.6 || 20.4
|-
| style="text-align:left;"|
| style="text-align:left;"|Phoenix
| 81 || 81 || 37.1 || .471 || .326 || .851 || 8.4 || 2.9 || 1.1 || 0.7 || 25.7
|-
| style="text-align:left;"|
| style="text-align:left;"|Phoenix
| 81 || 81 || 37.6 || .501 || .279 || .861 || 7.0 || 2.3 || 1.1 || 0.6 || 27.2
|-
| style="text-align:left;"|
| style="text-align:left;"|Phoenix
| 76 || 75 || 32.6 || .437 || .274 || .826 || 6.4 || 2.6 || 0.9 || 0.7 || 19.9
|-
| style="text-align:left;"|
| style="text-align:left;"|Phoenix
| 69 || 66 || 28.2 || .431 || .367 || .830 || 5.8 || 2.1 || 0.8 || 0.5 || 16.3
|-
| style="text-align:left;"|
| style="text-align:left;"|Phoenix
| 73 || 0 || 23.6 || .447 || .393 || .837 || 4.7 || 1.4 || 0.6 || 0.3 || 12.2
|-
| style="text-align:left;"|
| style="text-align:left;"|Utah
| 80 || 0 || 23.0 || .440 || .311 || .786 || 4.1 || 1.0 || 0.5 || 0.4 || 11.2
|-
| style="text-align:left;"|
| style="text-align:left;"|Utah
| 80 || 4 || 15.3 || .457 || .167 || .807 || 2.6 || 0.9 || 0.3 || 0.4 || 6.2
|-
| style="text-align:left;"|
| style="text-align:left;"|Charlotte
| 12 || 5 || 6.9 || .226 || .667 || .750 || 1.2 || 0.3 || 0.1 || 0.0 || 1.6
|-
| style="text-align:left;"|
| style="text-align:left;"|Philadelphia
| 1 || 0 || 10.0 || 1.000 || — || 1.000 || 2.0 || 0.0 || 2.0 || 0.0 || 6.0
|- class="sortbottom"
| style="text-align:center;" colspan="2"| Career
| 1,107 || 734 || 30.6 || .468 || .307 || .807 || 6.1 || 2.1 || 0.8 || 0.6 || 18.1
|- class="sortbottom"
| style="text-align:center;" colspan="2"| All-Star
| 4 || 1 || 21.0 || .518 || .400 || .773 || 4.0 || 1.3 || 1.5 || 0.0 || 19.3

Playoffs 

|-
|style="text-align:left;"|1984
|style="text-align:left;"|Seattle
|5||—||38.2||.475||.000||.667||6.6||1.6||1.0||0.6||13.6
|-
|style="text-align:left;"|1987
|style="text-align:left;"|Seattle
|14||14||35.6||.449||.333||.808||6.4||2.3||0.9||0.9||23.0
|-
|style="text-align:left;"|1988
|style="text-align:left;"|Seattle
|5||5||33.6||.549||.000||.829||6.2||2.2||0.6||0.2||25.8
|-
|style="text-align:left;"|1989
|style="text-align:left;"|Phoenix
|12||12||41.3||.459||.409||.859||10.9||3.8||1.1||1.3||26.0
|-
|style="text-align:left;"|1990
|style="text-align:left;"|Phoenix
|16||16||38.3||.425||.263||.879||6.7||1.9||0.4||0.4||22.2
|-
|style="text-align:left;"|1991
|style="text-align:left;"|Phoenix
|4||4||35.5||.409||.000||.737||5.8||2.5||1.8||1.3||17.0
|-
|style="text-align:left;"|1992
|style="text-align:left;"|Phoenix
|7||0||27.7||.459||.571||.844||4.4||2.7||0.3||0.7||15.6
|-
|style="text-align:left;"|1993
|style="text-align:left;"|Phoenix
|24||1||15.7||.388||.400||.815||2.7||0.5||0.3||0.4||7.3
|-
|style="text-align:left;"|1994
|style="text-align:left;"|Utah
|16||0||20.3||.361||.000||.793||2.8||0.8||0.3||0.6||5.8
|-
|style="text-align:left;"|1995
|style="text-align:left;"|Utah
|5||0||12.0||.500||.333||.692||2.6||0.4||0.4||0.0||6.4
|- class="sortbottom"
| style="text-align:center;" colspan="2"| Career
| 108 || 52 || 28.3 || .440 || .303 || .827 || 5.3 || 1.7 || 0.6 || 0.6 || 15.4

Personal life
After his playing career ended, Chambers bought a ranch in North Ogden for himself and family which became known as Shooting Star Ranch. Soon after, he became a community relations representative for the Suns, sold his ranch in Ogden, and moved permanently to Scottsdale, Arizona with his family. He also won a Rocky Mountain Emmy alongside senior editor Tommy Arguelles for their work on Sunderella Suns, a film commemorating the 40th anniversary of the 1975–76 Phoenix Suns season and the impact that season had on the state of Arizona as a whole.

See also

List of National Basketball Association career scoring leaders
List of National Basketball Association career free throw scoring leaders
List of National Basketball Association single-game scoring leaders

References

External links
NBA.com Historical Player Info
Tom Chambers's career stats at www.basketball-reference
Tom Chambers FIBA EuroLeague Profile
Israeli Super League Profile
Chambers answering fans questions at suns.com

1959 births
Living people
American expatriate basketball people in Israel
American men's basketball players
Basketball players from Utah
Charlotte Hornets players
Israeli Basketball Premier League players
Maccabi Tel Aviv B.C. players
National Basketball Association All-Stars
Philadelphia 76ers players
Phoenix Suns announcers
Phoenix Suns players
Power forwards (basketball)
San Diego Clippers draft picks
San Diego Clippers players
Seattle SuperSonics players
Sportspeople from Ogden, Utah
Utah Jazz players
Utah Utes men's basketball players